May Mok Mei-Wah is a Hong Kong award-winning sound effects editor, who also specializes in sound mixing, sound design, and ADR recording.

Filmography

Dead Slowly (2009) (sound mixer) (sound designer)
Exiled (2006) (sound mixer) (sound designer)
Election 2 (a.k.a. Triad Election) (sound designer) (sound mixer)
2 Become 1 (2006) (sound mixer) (sound designer)
Love @ First Note (2006) (sound mixer) (sound designer)
Fatal Contact (2006) (sound mixer) (sound designer)
Election (2005) (sound designer) (sound mixer) 
The Unusual Youth (2005) (sound mixer) (sound designer)
Yesterday Once More (2004) (sound designer) (sound mixer)
Throw Down (2004) (sound designer) (sound mixer)
McDull, prince de la bun (2004) (sound designer) (sound mixer)
Breaking News (2004) (dialogue recordist) (sound mixer) (sound)
Running on Karma (2003) (adr mixer) (sound effects editor) 
Turn Left, Turn Right (2003) (sound effects editor)
PTU (2003) (adr editor) (adr recordist) (sound)
Memory of Youth (2003) (sound designer) (sound mixer)
Love for All Seasons (2003) (adr editor) (adr recordist) (sound effects editor) 
My Left Eye Sees Ghosts (2002) (adr editor) (adr recordist) (sound effects editor)
Fat Choi Spirit (2002) (adr editor) (adr recordist) (sound effects editor) 
Second Time Around (2002) (sound effects editor)
Vampire Hunters (a.k.a. The Era of Vampire)  (2002)  (adr editor) (adr recordist) (sound effects editor)
Ghost Office (2002) (adr editor) (adr recordist) (sound effects editor)

Running Out of Time 2 (2001) (adr editor) (adr recordist) (sound effects editor)
My Life as McDull (2001) (sound designer) (sound mixer)
The Legend of Zu (a.k.a. Zu Warriors) (2001) (sound effects editor)
Running Out of Time 2 (2001) (adr editor) (adr recordist) (sound effects editor)
Love on a Diet (2001) (sound effects editor) (sound engineer)
Wu yen (2001) (sound editor)
Let's Sing Along (2001) (adr editor) (adr recordist) (sound effects editor)
Gimme Gimme (2001) (adr editor) (adr recordist) (sound effects editor)
Runaway (2001 film) (adr editor) (adr recordist) (sound effects editor)
Comeuppance (2000) (adr editor) (adr recordist) (sound effects editor)
Time and Tide (2000) (assistant sound editor) (uncredited) 
Needing You... (2000) (sound editor) 
Spacked Out (2000) (sound) 
Help!!! (2000) (sound effects editor)
The Mission (1999) (sound editor) 
Sealed With A Kiss (2000) (sound designer) (sound mixer)
The Victim (2000) (location sound recordist) (adr recordist) (sound effects editor)
Running Out of Time (1999) (boom operator) (sound effects editor)  
Where a Good Man Goes (1999) (boom operator) (sound editor)
Option Zero (1998) (assistant boom operator) (uncredited)
Task Force (1998) (assistant boom operator) (uncredited)
Snapshots (1998) (location sound recordist) (sound designer)

References

External links

HKFA Running Out of Time (暗戰)

Living people
Hong Kong people
Year of birth missing (living people)